Harris Farm may refer to:

 William Harris Family Farmstead, Campton, Georgia, listed on the NRHP in Walton County, Georgia
 Harris Farm (Walkersville, Maryland), listed on the NRHP in Maryland
 John Harris House and Farm, in Boston and/or Brookline, MA, listed on the NRHP in Massachusetts
 Harris Farm (Marblehead, Massachusetts), listed on the NRHP in Massachusetts
 Rascoe-Harris Farm, Liberty, Tennessee, listed on the NRHP in Sumner County, Tennessee
 Harris Farm (Albemarle County, Virginia), added to the NRHP in 2015
 Harris Farm Markets, an Australian food retail store chain

See also
Harris House (disambiguation)
Harris Building (disambiguation)